Lieu-Croissant Abbey was a Cistercian abbey in Mancenans, a commune of Doubs in France. It was first built in 1134 and it was destroyed during the French Revolution in 1791.

During the Crusades on the way from Milan to Cologne, the relics of the Magi were entrusted to the monks of this abbey, earning it the nickname Abbey of the Three Kings.

Notes

Crusader churches
Cistercian monasteries in France
Buildings and structures in Doubs
Christian monasteries established in the 12th century